Cene is a comune (municipality) in the Province of Bergamo in the Italian region of Lombardy, located about  northeast of Milan and about  northeast of Bergamo.

Cene borders the following municipalities: Albino, Bianzano, Casnigo, Cazzano Sant'Andrea, Fiorano al Serio, Gaverina Terme, Gazzaniga, Leffe.

References

External links

Official website